The 2022 Oregon wildfire season is an ongoing series of wildfires burning in the U.S. state of Oregon.

On August 28th, 2022, Governor Kate Brown declared a statewide emergency because of the Rum Creek fire and surrounding fires

In August, Governor Kate Brown invoked the Emergency Conflagration Act because of the Miller Road/Dodge Fire.

As of August 3, 2022, there were 46 active fires. The Green Butte Fire (formerly Incident 537) is zero percent contained, as of August 2. Similarly, the Deadline Flat Fire is zero percent contained, as of August 6.

List of wildfires 

References

Wildfires
2022 meteorology
2022